The C&C 48 Custom is a Canadian sailboat, that was designed by C&C Design and first built in 1973.

Production
The design was built by C&C Yachts in Canada starting in 1973. Production ended in 1976.

Design
The C&C 48 Custom is a small recreational keelboat, built predominantly of fibreglass, with wood trim. It has a masthead sloop rig, a raked stem, a raised reverse transom, an internally-mounted spade-type rudder controlled by a wheel and a fixed fin keel. It displaces  and carries  of lead ballast.

The design has a PHRF racing average handicap of 60 with a high of 66 and low of 57.

See also
List of sailing boat types

References

Keelboats
1970s sailboat type designs
Sailing yachts
Sailboat type designs by C&C Design
Sailboat types built by C&C Yachts